The 2014 Mobil 1 SportsCar Grand Prix presented by Hawk Performance was a sports car racing event held at Canadian Tire Motorsport Park near Bowmanville, Ontario from July 10 to the 13, 2014.  The race was the eighth round of the inaugural Tudor United SportsCar Championship, replacing the former American Le Mans Series that previously held the Grand Prix since 1999.  The race marked the 29th IMSA sanctioned sports car race held at the facility. Daytona Prototypes were introduced to the race for the first time as part of the development of the United SportsCar Championship.

The race was won by OAK Racing's Morgan LMP2 - Nissan driven by Olivier Pla and Gustavo Yacamán, ahead of the Spirit of Daytona Racing's Corvette DP and Wayne Taylor Racing's Corvette DP.  The GTLM class winners were Corvette Racing in their fourth straight victory of the season, with drivers Jan Magnussen and Antonio García.  Riley Motorsports also earned the first ever win for the SRT Viper GT3-R in GTD with Jeroen Bleekemolen and Ben Keating.

Race

Race result

References

External links
 2014 SportsCar Grand Prix Race Broadcast (Tudor United SportsCar Championship YouTube Channel)

2014 in Canadian motorsport
Sebring
2014 in Ontario
July 2014 sports events in Canada
2014